Chris Rooney (born May 26, 1975, in South Boston, Massachusetts) is a National Hockey League referee, who wears uniform number 5. His first NHL regular season game was Tampa Bay Lightning Vs Atlanta Thrashers on November 22, 2000. He also worked the 2010 NHL Winter Classic with Kerry Fraser at Fenway Park between Boston Bruins and Philadelphia Flyers. He also officiated in the 2012, 2013, 2018, 2019 Stanley Cup Finals as well as 2022 Stanley Cup Finals.

References 

1975 births
Living people
People from South Boston
Sportspeople from Boston
National Hockey League officials
American ice hockey officials